Hand to Mouth is the second studio album by English new wave band General Public, released in 1986 by I.R.S. Records.

The album peaked at No. 83 on the Billboard 200 chart.

Critical reception
Trouser Press wrote that "the music goes down smoothly enough, but without any lasting impression."

Track listing
 "Come Again!" – 3:43 (Mickey Billingham, David Wakeling)
 "Faults and All" – 3:35 (Roger Charlery, Horace Panter, Wakeling)
 "Forward as One" – 6:08 (Wakeling)
 "Murder" – 4:22 (Billingham, Wakeling)
 "Cheque in the Post" – 3:39 (Billingham, Charlery)
 "Too Much or Nothing" – 4:25 (Wakeling)
 "Love Without the Fun" – 3:29 (Billingham, Wakeling)
 "In Conversation" – 5:43 (Billingham, Charlery)
 "Never All There" – 4:04 (Billingham, Charlery, Wakeling)
 "Cry on Your Own Shoulder" – 3:54 (Charlery, Wakeling)

1993 I.R.S. Records re-issue bonus tracks
 "General Public" (12" Version) (Charlery, Wakeling)
 "Limited Balance" (Charlery, Wakeling)
 "All the Rage" (Billingham, Andy "Stoker" Growcott, Panter, Kevin White)
 "Taking the Day Off" (Wakeling)
 "Day to Day" (Live) (Charlery, Wakeling)
 "Where's the Line?" (Live) (Billingham, Charlery, Panter, Wakeling)
 "Tenderness (Live)" (Billingham, Charlery, Wakeling)
 "Hot You're Cool (Live)" (Billingham Charlery, Panter, Wakeling)

All writing credits as per ASCAP database.

Personnel
General Public
Dave Wakeling – vocals, guitar
Ranking Roger – vocals
Gianni Minardi –  guitar
Horace Panter – bass
Mickey Billingham – keyboards
Mario Minardi – drums

with:
Saxa – saxophone
Steve Brennan – violin
Gaspar Lawal – percussion
Pato Banton – toasting
Digby Cleaver –  rap
Justine Carpenter, Sandra Loban - vocals
Credits

 Martin Burgoyne – cover art
 Peter Ashworth – photography
 C More Tone – design

References

General Public albums
1986 albums
I.R.S. Records albums